Blue Abyss is a research pool planned for construction in Cornwall, England, United Kingdom.

The Blue Abyss pool will be used for training and development for commercial diving, space exploration, human life science, and submersibles. This pool could aid in reducing risk in extreme environments, including space and the sub-aquatic.

The pool 
The pool itself will have several entrance points and includes a series of depths. The pool was designed by architect Robin Partington.

The facility itself will include:

 A multi-layered pool
 Sliding roof to facilitate insertion of larger objects into pool
Astronaut training centre
Hypobaric and hyperbaric chambers
Microgravity suite
 Training center with six classrooms
 Diving quality compressed gas supply (air and nitrox)
 Secure workshops, lay down areas and storage
 Onsite catering
 Hotel

Commercial diving 
The Blue Abyss will aid in testing, training, and pre-operational exercises for the commercial diving sector. The pools indoor facility will allow for diving any time and year round. The facility will not be dependent on weather. A 30-tonne crane and lifting platforms will allow for roof access to the pool, and the sliding roof will facilitate access to insert larger training objects into the pool. The pool will allow for deep water training for offshore and inshore commercial divers and diving teams. This training will include scenarios and conditions that otherwise would be impossible for safe diving training. This would allow for an acceleration of emergency services, oceanographic research, archaeology, and civil engineering.

Submersibles 
Submersible vehicles are a new alternative to classic diving methods. The indoor pool will permit a controlled environment allowing for submersible trials and training, including simulations. This would reduce the risk of subsea operations by moving trials and training into a safe and heavily monitored facility. Testing and training is expected to include hydrographic, pipeline and cable surveys, inspections of wind turbine foundations, vessel hulls and installations, oceanographic studies, and even film production. The pool will include roof access, as well as an R&D capability for new ROV and AUV sub-systems.

Space exploration 

The Blue Abyss will provide a facility for spaceflight simulation, like a mission to Mars simulation. It will offer safety and experience for astronauts undergoing human spaceflight training. The facility will include a neutral buoyancy pool, parabolic flight and centrifuge training, hypo and hyperbolic chambers and micro-gravity simulation suite, and an environmental research centre.

Human life science 
The centre will provide human physiology and human robotic interface R&D capabilities. This will allow for extreme environment research, including human spaceflight.

The Kuehnegger Human Performance Centre will have astronaut and athlete test and evaluation facilities, with full-body suspension and hypobaric chambers for altitude training.

See also

 Deepspot
 Nemo 33
 Y-40 pool

References

External links
 

Research and development in the United Kingdom
Swimming pools
Space industry
Swimming venues in England
Underwater diving sites in England